The Dresbach Formation is a geologic formation in Wisconsin. It preserves fossils dating back to the Cambrian period.

See also

 List of fossiliferous stratigraphic units in Wisconsin
 Paleontology in Wisconsin

References
 

Cambrian geology of Wisconsin
Cambrian southern paleotropical deposits